Bernhard VI, Lord of Lippe ( – 1415) was a German nobleman.  He was the ruling Lord of Lippe from 1410 until his death.  He was the son of Simon III and his wife, Irmgard of Hoya.

Marriage and issue 
On 28 June 1393, he married Margaret, the daughter of Count Henry VI of Waldeck-Landau.  This marriage remained childless.

He remarried in 1403, to Elisabeth of Moers.  They had four children together:
 Simon IV (1404-1429), Lord of Lippe from 1415 until his death
 Frederick (d. between 1417 and 1425)
 Otto (died in Brake on 30 September 1433), joined the clergy
 Irmgard (d. 17 July 1463), married  to Lord William of Buren (d. 1461)

References 
 
 Philippine Charlotte Auguste Piderit: Die lippischen Edelherrn im Mittelalter, Detmold, 1876, p. 94 ff, 

Lords of Lippe
1370 births
1415 deaths
Year of birth uncertain
14th-century German nobility
15th-century German nobility